Sky High! is the fourth studio album by the American soul/R&B group Tavares, released in 1976 on the Capitol label.

Commercial performance

The album peaked at no. 20 on the R&B albums chart. It also reached no. 24 on the Billboard 200. The album features the singles "Heaven Must Be Missing an Angel", which peaked at no. 3 on the Hot Soul Singles chart and no. 15 on the Billboard Hot 100, and "Don't Take Away the Music", which charted at no. 14 on the Hot Soul Singles chart and no. 34 on the Billboard Hot 100. Both songs reach no. 1 on the Hot Dance Club Play chart.

Track listing

Personnel 
James Gadson – drums
John Barnes – piano
Scott Edwards – bass
Bob "Boogie" Bowles, Melvin "Wah Wah" Ragin – guitar
Bob Zimmitti, Paulinho Magalhaes, Paulinho da Costa, Freddie Perren – percussion
Electric Ivory Experience (John Barnes, Bob Robitaille) – synthesizers

Charts
Album

Singles

References

External links

1976 albums
Tavares (group) albums
Albums produced by Freddie Perren
Capitol Records albums
Albums recorded at Total Experience Recording Studios